Eileen Flynn (born 1989/90) is an Irish independent politician who has served as a Senator since June 2020, after being nominated by the Taoiseach.

Her background is in community development and activism on behalf of Irish Travellers. In June 2020, Taoiseach Micheál Martin appointed Flynn to Seanad Éireann, the Irish Senate. She is the first Traveller to serve in the Oireachtas (legislature).

Early life
Eileen and her twin sister Sally were born in Labre Park, a halting site located in Ballyfermot in Dublin. Flynn's mother died of pneumonia at the age of 48, when Eileen and Sally were 10 years old. Flynn subsequently struggled in school and rebelled against authority. However, Flynn credits her teachers for not giving up on her, and despite her problems both she and her twin became the first members of the Labre Park community to reach third level education in 2008. Flynn studied at Trinity College Dublin as part of an access course before attending Ballyfermot College of Further Education and later earning a degree at Maynooth University, a BA in community development.

Activism
Following the completion of her education, Flynn had been an activist and community worker for a decade, working with groups such as the Irish Traveller Movement, the National Traveller Women’s Forum and Ballyfermot Traveller Action Programme. She also campaigned on issues such as housing, marriage equality, abortion rights and anti-racism.

Political career
Flynn stood as a candidate for the Labour Panel in the 2020 Seanad election, but missed out by a very narrow margin. On 28 June 2020, she became a Senator upon being nominated by the Taoiseach, and in doing so became the first-ever Traveller to be a member the Oireachtas. Pavee Point, the Traveller Advocacy organisation, hailed her ascension to the Seanad as "historic", as did the National Women's Council of Ireland. David Norris, the longest-serving member of the Senate, called her nomination a significant advance. Flynn stated her objectives in the Seanad will be "mental health services, unemployment among Travellers, opportunities for minority groups and getting hate-crime legislation enacted".

Within three days of taking her seat in the Senate, a male senator confronted Flynn and called her a "token" nomination. Flynn retorted back that she had earned her position through her activism. 

In November 2020, Flynn was elected as chairperson of the Joint Oireachtas Committee on Key Issues affecting the Traveller Community.

In 2022, Flynn tabled a bill in the Seanad to replace the term "child pornography" with "child sexual exploitation material" in legislation, stating that the term "does not truly reflect the nature of the abuse".

Awards
Flynn was on the list of the BBC's 100 Women announced on 23 November 2020.

Personal life
Since 2018, Flynn lives in Ardara, County Donegal, with her husband Liam Whyte, a settled man, and their two daughters.

References

Living people
21st-century women members of Seanad Éireann
Members of the 26th Seanad
Irish Travellers
Alumni of Maynooth University
Nominated members of Seanad Éireann
BBC 100 Women
Year of birth missing (living people)